Blair Michael Alston (born 23 March 1992) is a Scottish professional footballer who plays as a midfielder for Kilmarnock. Alston has previously played for Hamilton Academical, St Johnstone and Falkirk. Alston scored the second goal in Kilmarnock's 2-1 win over Arbroath, which won the league at Rugby Park securing Kilmarnock's promotion back to the Scottish Premiership.

Career
Alston made his first team debut for Falkirk against Partick Thistle in their League Cup match on 24 August 2010. He scored his first goal for the club in their 2–1 win also against Partick Thistle on 12 April 2011. On 1 April 2012, he came on as a late substitute as Falkirk beat Hamilton Academical 1–0 to win the Scottish Challenge Cup.

Alston moved to St Johnstone in May 2016 under freedom of contract.

In June 2019 he signed for Hamilton Academical.

In August 2020 he signed for Falkirk on a two-year contract for a second spell at the club.

Alston left Falkirk during the 2021 close season and signed a two-year contract with Kilmarnock.  Alston would go on to score the winning goal against Abroath in the 90th minute to secure Kilmarnock’s promotion back to the Scottish Premiership.

Career statistics

Honours
Falkirk
Scottish Challenge Cup: 2011–12
Kilmarnock
Scottish Championship: 2021–22

References

External links
 

Falkirk F.C. players
Scottish Football League players
1992 births
Living people
Scottish Professional Football League players
Footballers from Kirkcaldy
Scottish footballers
Association football midfielders
St Johnstone F.C. players
Hamilton Academical F.C. players
Kilmarnock F.C. players